The , literally translated from German as "Schindler Jews", were a group of roughly 1,200 Jews saved by Oskar Schindler during the Holocaust. They survived the years of the Nazi regime primarily through the intervention of Schindler, who afforded them protected status as industrial workers at his enamelware factory in Kraków, capital of the General Government, and after 1944, in an armaments factory in occupied Czechoslovakia. There, they avoided being sent to death camps and survived the war. Schindler expended his personal fortune made as an industrialist to save the Schindlerjuden.

The story of the Schindlerjuden has been depicted in the book Schindler's Ark, by Thomas Keneally, and Steven Spielberg's film adaptation of the novel, Schindler's List. Poldek Pfefferberg, one of the survivors, persuaded Keneally to write the novel and Spielberg to produce the film.

List
The original list of  transported to Schindler's Brünnlitz factory in Brněnec, occupied Czechoslovakia, was prepared by Mietek Pemper, Itzhak Stern and Oskar Schindler in September and October 1944. While the list was long thought to have been lost, in April 2009, a carbon copy of the original list, documenting 801 names, was discovered among the documentation Schindler's Ark author Thomas Keneally had donated to the State Library of New South Wales in Sydney.

Another list with 1,000 names, compiled by Pemper upon the prisoners' arrival on 21 October 1944 at Schindler's Brünnlitz factory, was presented by him to the International Tracing Service in 1958.

Two lists of 1,098 prisoners made by camp administrators in Brünnlitz on 18 April 1945 are also extant and preserved in Yad Vashem Memorial, where Oskar and wife Emilie Schindler are recognized among the Righteous. The first list contains 297 female prisoners and the second contains 801 male prisoners. There are several preserved copies and carbon copies of the later list from April 1945, some in museums and others in private hands, mostly those of former prisoners' families.

Notable  
 Abraham Bankier (1895–1956), businessman and Schindler's factory manager
 Joseph Bau (1920–2002), artist, poet and writer
 Moshe Bejski (1921–2007), Israeli supreme court justice
  (1914–2011), resistance fighter and Schindler's secretary 
  (1889–1979), doctor and writer
 Meir Bosak (1912–1992), historian, writer and poet
  (1929–2014), musician and public speaker
  (1876–1950), doctor and writer
 Laura Hillman (1923-2020), museum docent and writer
 Ryszard Horowitz (born 1939), photographer
 Helen Jonas-Rosenzweig (1925–2018), maid of Amon Göth, documentary subject
 Leon Leyson (1929–2013), teacher and writer
 Beno Lowi (1920–2009), President of the Jewish National Fund (JNF) of Canada
 Mietek Pemper (1920–2011), stenographer and writer
 Poldek Pfefferberg (1913–2001), business owner who inspired Schindler's Ark, portrayed by Jonathan Sagall in Schindler's List
 Leo Rosner (1918–2008), musician
 Itzhak Stern (1901–1969), Schindler's accountant, portrayed by Ben Kingsley in Schindler's List
 Moshe Taube (1927–2020), scholar and cantor

Historiography 

 A memoir by Schindler survivor Joseph Bau about his experiences during the Holocaust, being rescued by Schindler, and the impact of these experiences after the war.

 The documentary which provided much of the research for the Spielberg film.
 A compilation of interviews with many of those saved by Schindler. Includes reports of their experiences in the concentration camps and with Schindler, and their stories of life after the war. Includes over one hundred personal photographs.
 A biography of Schindler, with emphasis on his rescue activities during the war. Part of the "Holocaust Heroes and Nazi Criminals" series for young adult readers. Includes glossary and index.
 A comprehensive, academic account of Schindler's early life, business career, rescue attempts, and postwar experiences in Germany and Argentina. Based on numerous personal interviews and archival sources, including Schindler's personal papers discovered in 1997. Includes extensive bibliography and index.
 A collection of essays, articles, and interviews which illuminate Schindler and the international effect of his story. Includes a reprint of an article written about Schindler in 1949 and sections about Thomas Keneally's book Schindler's List, Steven Spielberg's film adaptation of the story, and issues and implications of the Holocaust.
 Relates stories about Schindler and his efforts to save Jews in the context of other rescue efforts and courageous acts during the Holocaust. Examines the motivation of Schindler and other rescuers, including personal, psychological, and historical factors.

 A comprehensive account of Schindler's life, creation of the famous list and the daily reality of the life in the Brünnlitz factory. Based on interviews, books and archival sources.
 The story of a Schindler's List survivor, her family, and her relationship with fellow inmate Dick Hillman in various concentration and labor camps during the Holocaust.
 A fictional recreation of the story of Oskar Schindler, an industrialist who saved 1,100 Jews from death by employing them in his factory in Kraków. Drawn from authentic records, the testimony of many of those saved by Schindler, and the author's extensive research. Published under the title Schindler's List in the United States.
 A memoir by the author of Schindler's Ark about the process of writing the novel, and the movie based on the novel that followed. Includes the stories of Schindler survivors, especially focusing on Leopold "Poldek" Pfefferberg.
 A memoir by one of the youngest Schindler survivors, who had to stand on a wooden box to operate factory machinery. Intended for young readers.
 A brief, personal account of Schindler's life and heroism. Written for young adults.
 An autobiography by a young Schindler survivor and her family, from Kraków to Brünnlitz.
 A biography of two  sisters.
 A biography focusing on Oskar Schindler's rescue activity during the Holocaust, based on published and unpublished materials and eyewitness interviews conducted on and off by the author since 1987.

 A Schindler survivor's personal account of his activities during the Holocaust, including his forced employment by Amon Göth, including the assistance he provided to Schindler in his rescue operations, and his testifying against Göth in his war crime trial after the end of the war.

 Interweaves the biography of Oskar Schindler with the larger events of the Holocaust, including the rise of anti-Semitism and the implementation of the "Final Solution." Briefly discusses Schindler's life after the war. Includes photographs. Written for young adults.

 An autobiography by Oskar Schindler's wife, written with the help of Erika Rosenberg, telling her story from childhood to after the war. Presents a detailed, behind-the-scenes account of the list's development and the steps taken to save Jews. Includes numerous photos and two maps.
 Includes a section on  Sol Urbeck.

 Uses personal testimony and historical documents to construct a more personal picture of Schindler and to describe the great lengths he took to save Jews by employing them in his factory and bargaining for their lives.
 Examines Schindler's legacy through testimony gathered from the Polish Jews saved by his efforts. Contains articles discussing Schindler, the list, and Płaszów concentration camp and the enamelware factory. A short list of films, press reports, and books is also presented, along with numerous photos from a variety of sources.

 A survivor's personal narrative describing his life in Kraków before the war, his imprisonment in concentration camps, and his rescue by Oskar Schindler. Also tells of his life after the war. Includes personal photographs. Previously published as A Voice in the Chorus: Life as a Teenager in the Holocaust.

References

External links
List of 1098 Schindlerjuden (Schindler Jews), a copy from the Auschwitz museum
Schindler: Stepping-stone to Life
SCHINDLERJUDEN: WHY DID HE DO IT?, Villanova University

 
Lists of Jews